Wyevale Garden Centres (formerly The Garden Centre Group) was a British chain of garden centres. At its height, it was the largest garden centre operator in the United Kingdom, with 154 locations in England and Wales. It became the largest garden centre group by acquiring the Blooms of Bressingham chain in February 2007, and traded under both the Wyevale and Blooms names. It had acquired many smaller garden centre locations during its time, which also helped to allow it to reach its peak.

Following financial difficulties, Dobbies Garden Centres became the largest national garden centre operator in the country by purchasing the vast majority of Wyevale and Blooms locations in 2018. Any remaining locations were sold to independent owners and smaller chains, with the final outlets sold and converted to British Garden Centres in 2019.

As of late 2020, Wyevale is currently going through the final legal stages of liquidation with Deloitte.

History 
The company started as a mail-order nursery operated by the Williamson family in the 1930s in Hereford and in 1967 opened the first Wyevale Garden Centre on Kings Acre Road. It became a public limited company (PLC) in 1987, and was listed on the London Stock Exchange.

In the 1990s, the chain purchased the Kennedy's Garden Centres, and Cramphorn Garden Centre chains and transformed all outlets into Wyevale.

In 2007, Blooms of Bressingham was purchased by Wyevale, Blooms had previously acquired the Jardiniere Garden Centre chain.

In February 2009, following the collapse of the Icelandic investment company Baugur Group who had a large stake in the firm, the Bank of Scotland became the majority owner of the firm in a debt-for-equity deal. In 2009, the name was changed to The Garden Centre Group.

The company was bought by private equity firm Terra Firma in March 2012.

On 17 July 2014, the company announced it would be rebranding to Wyevale Garden Centres.

In May 2018, the company announced that its investors (Terra Firma) had decided to put it up for sale as a complete business or for its individual garden centres.

On 16 August 2018, Wyevale sold eight of its largest garden centres to Blue Diamond, including Bicester, Oxfordshire; Endsleigh, Devon; Sanders, Burnham-on-sea; Cadbury, Bristol; Cardiff, Wales; Percy Thrower, Shrewsbury; Melbicks, Birmingham; and Weybridge, Surrey.

On 30 August 2018, Wyevale announced the sale of five garden centres to individual buyers, including Nailsworth Garden Centre which was sold to Blue Diamond. A further four centres were sold to individual buyers on 4 September 2018 Dobbies Garden Centres, headquartered in Scotland, agreed to purchase a portfolio of five Wyevale Garden Centres sites in England on 8 October.

On 21 May 2019, Wyevale announced the sale of two garden centres to Blackbrooks Garden Centres. The sale consisted of their Lower Dicker & Hastings stores. In the same month, Dobbies purchased 37 of Wyevale locations, doubling their reach and becoming the largest garden centre company in the UK.

On 10 September 2019, the business announced the sale of its remaining centres to British Garden Centres, leading to the closure of the historic Wyevale Garden Centres brand.

See also
 Dobbies Garden Centres

References

External links
Official website

Garden centres
Retail companies of the United Kingdom
Retail companies established in 1960
Retail companies disestablished in 2019
Horticultural companies of the United Kingdom